Michael Robert "Mike" Watson (born 1979) is a British-born curator, art critic and theorist, currently based in Finland.

Education 
In 2012, Watson completed his PhD thesis at Goldsmiths College, University of London, in the department of Visual Cultures, under the supervision of Alex Duttmann, moderated by Howard Caygill and Peter Hallward. His thesis examined the relationship between Theodor Adorno's Shudder and Conceptual Art.

Career 
In 2012, Watson founded Joan of Art, in collaboration with Nomas Foundation of Rome, which envisages a free education system set up within a network of art spaces. Additionally, he has curated numerous international projects and exhibitions including at the MACRO Museum and Fondazione Pastificio Cerere, Rome; the Venice Biennale in 2013 and 2015 and Manifesta12 in 2018. 

As a writer, Watson has regularly contributed to Frieze, Art Review,  Nero and Radical Philosophy, on topics such as art, social activism and education.

His first book entitled Towards a Conceptual Militancy, published by ZerO books, came out in May 2016. Can the Left Learn to Meme: Adorno, Video Games and Stranger Things was released in November 2019 and The Memeing of Mark Fisher: How the Frankfurt School Foresaw Capitalist Realism and What To Do About It in October 2021, both also published by ZerO books.

References

1979 births
Living people
British curators
British art critics
Alumni of Goldsmiths, University of London